The first USS Josephine (SP-913), later USS SP-913, was a United States Navy patrol vessel in commission from 1917 to 1918.

Josephine was built as a civilian motorboat of the same name in 1916 by the New York Yacht, Launch, and Engine Company at Morris Heights in the Bronx, New York. The U.S. Navy acquired her from her owner, L. A. Lehmaier, on 9 August 1917 for World War I service as a patrol vessel. She was commissioned as USS Josephine (SP-913) at the New York Navy Yard at Brooklyn, New York, on 20 September 1917.

Attached to the 3rd Naval District, Josephine performed section patrol duty in the New York City area, including Long Island Sound. She was renamed USS SP-913 on 11 April 1918.

"Having proved unsuit(able)" for naval service, on 6 July 1918 the Navy directed that SP-913 be returned to her owner. She was returned to Lehmaier on 20 December 1918.

Josephine (SP-913) should not be confused with two other patrol vessels, USS Josephine (SP-1243) and USS Josephine (SP-3295), which also were in commission in the U.S. Navy during World War I.

Notes

References

Department of the Navy: Navy History and Heritage Command: Online Library of Selected Images: U.S. Navy Ships: USS Josephine (SP-913), 1917-1918. Renamed SP-913 in 1918. Originally the civilian motor boat Josephine (1916)
NavSource Online: Section Patrol Craft Photo Archive: Josephine (SP 913)

Patrol vessels of the United States Navy
World War I patrol vessels of the United States
Ships built in Morris Heights, Bronx
1916 ships